Əli Bayramlı (also, Aly-Bayramly) is a village in the Qakh Rayon of Azerbaijan.

References 

Populated places in Qakh District